is a former Japanese football player.

Mori made one substitute's appearance in the 2009 Emperor's Cup for FC Gifu.

Club statistics

References

External links

1985 births
Living people
Nippon Bunri University alumni
Association football people from Kagoshima Prefecture
Japanese footballers
J2 League players
FC Gifu players
Association football defenders